Jeff (or Jeffrey or Jeffery) Donaldson may refer to:

 Jeff Donaldson (American football) (born 1962), former American football defensive back
 Jeff Donaldson (artist) (died 2004), American visual artist
 Jeffery Donaldson, Canadian poet and critic
 Jeffrey Donaldson (born 1962), Northern Irish politician